The Financial Services Act 2010 (c. 28) is an Act of the Parliament of the United Kingdom which regulates bonuses paid to employees of banks. It was announced on 27 September 2009 by Prime Minister Gordon Brown on The Andrew Marr Show on BBC One. Brown said that the new law would be included in the next Queen's speech and was the result of talks at the G20 summit in Pittsburgh where other countries were looking at similar action. He also said that the Act's purpose would be to ensure that bankers after the global economic crisis do not go back to "business as usual".

Provisions
The proposed Act is expected to include penalties for banks that do not follow a set of standards for methods of remuneration.

See also
Financial Services Authority

United Kingdom Acts of Parliament 2010